, (born as Shigefumi Fukuyama, January 28, 1950) is a former Japanese professional boxer. Fukuyama was born in Kagoshima Prefecture, Japan, and is a resident of Los Angeles, California. In 1976 he fought and was defeated by D. K. Poison of Ghana.

References

1950 births
Living people
Japanese male boxers
Featherweight boxers